Boza Jean Armel Drolé (born 18 August 1997) is an Ivorian footballer who plays as a winger for Italian  club Fano.

Club career
Drolé was born in the Ivory Coast, was orphaned at a young age, and travelled to Italy as a refugee.

In 2013, Drolé joined Tieffe Club, and eventually transferred to Perugia in the Serie B. Drolé made his professional debut in a 0-0 Serie B tie with Cesena in September 2015.

Drolé transferred from Perugia to Antalyaspor on 21 January 2017. Initially on loan, he subsequently joined the club permanently and served a loan stint at Ümraniyespor before establishing himself in the first team.

On 25 July 2019, Drolé joined Segunda División side Las Palmas on a season-long loan deal.

International career
Drolé made his debut for the Ivory Coast national under-20 football team in a 3–2 win over Qatar U20 on 21 March 2016.

References

External links
 
 
 
 
 

1997 births
Footballers from Abidjan
Living people
Ivorian footballers
Ivory Coast under-20 international footballers
Association football wingers
A.C. Perugia Calcio players
Antalyaspor footballers
Ümraniyespor footballers
UD Las Palmas players
Doxa Katokopias FC players
Alma Juventus Fano 1906 players
Serie B players
TFF First League players
Süper Lig players
Segunda División players
Cypriot First Division players
Serie D players
Ivorian expatriate footballers
Ivorian expatriate sportspeople in Italy
Expatriate footballers in Italy
Ivorian expatriate sportspeople in Turkey
Expatriate footballers in Turkey
Ivorian expatriate sportspeople in Spain
Expatriate footballers in Spain
Ivorian expatriate sportspeople in Cyprus
Expatriate footballers in Cyprus